Stroke 9 is an American alternative rock band formed in Marin County, California, in 1989.

History
The band formed due to a "Rock Band" class at Marin Academy in San Rafael, California. In 1990, as a project, students Luke Esterkyn, Greg Gueldner, Tom Haddad and Kirsten Stromberg went to Jim Reitzel's Right Sole Studio in Kentfield, California. They produced a demo containing five songs, including "Blindness", "Wild", and "Dream Song". After spring that year, they took their final half-semester off during Senior Project to form the band Stroke 9 for full credit. They set up in Esterkyn's basement, and started writing songs for their next demo.

Stroke 9 had their first "official" live performance at Caffe Nuvo in San Anselmo. They split up for the summer and didn't get back together until the summer of 1991. Haddad and Stromberg had no desire to revive Stroke 9, so Esterkyn and Gueldner recruited old schoolmates John McDermott and Stephen Heath. They moved from the basement to the garage and played publicly anywhere that they could. The band put out two independent releases in 1993 and 1995. Eric Stock began filling in on drums in April 1997; Stock was a New York transplant who had previously toured with Modern English.

After signing to Universal Records, the band released Nasty Little Thoughts in 1999, which charted in the US, yielded two rock radio hits, a re-release of "Little Black Backpack" (originally released in Bumper to Bumper) and "Letters", and was certified Gold by the RIAA on April 21, 2000. The band appeared in the film EDtv as part of the promotion of Nasty Little Thoughts. A second album on Universal followed, entitled Rip It Off. The album's art cover was made to resemble a bootleg CD-R, similar to that of System of a Down's Steal This Album!, which was released about a year later.

The album was not promoted heavily, and its lead single, "Kick Some Ass", was less successful at radio. "Kick Some Ass" appeared in Kevin Smith's Jay and Silent Bob Strike Back during a montage of Jay and Silent Bob flying around the country to attack message board users who bashed them. Late in 2003, the band split with Universal and announced plans to release its next album, All In, independently.

The band released The Last of the International Playboys on June 5, 2007, on Rock Ridge Records. Stroke 9 also recorded "Tap Tap Domination" for the iPhone OS game Tap Tap Revenge. It features "The Yeah Song" as a free downloadable track.

On November 14, 2019, the band announced via their social media a new single "Calafrio" as well as a new album of the same name. The album was released January 17, 2020. During the summer of 2021, Stroke 9 released three new tracks, and a year later continued to release new songs, one of which was written for the film Losers of Eden.

Members

Discography

Studio albums
Boy Meets Girl (1993)
Bumper to Bumper (1995)
Nasty Little Thoughts (Universal Records, 1999) Billboard Top 200 peak No. 83
Rip It Off (Universal, 2002)
All In (Rock Ridge Records, 2004)
The Last of the International Playboys (Rock Ridge Records, 2007)
Calafrio (2020)

Demo albums
Bad Language Makes for Bad Feelings (1990)
Music About Friends, Acquaintances, and People We Don't Even Know (1991)

Compilation albums
Hidden Treasures (Rock Ridge Records, 2005) [unreleased tracks & other demos]
Cafe Cuts (Rock Ridge Records, 2006) [acoustic versions of popular songs from their discography]
Songs We Didn't Love (Released independently, 2020) [unreleased and unfinished demos]

Extended plays
Jessica Album Part 1 (EP) (2010)

Charting singles

References

External links
Stroke 9 official website

Musical groups from San Francisco
Musical groups established in 1989
Alternative rock groups from California
Rock Ridge Music artists